Robert Wilson Patterson (1850–1910) was an American newspaper editor and publisher.  He was born in Chicago, attended Lake Forest Academy in Lake Forest, Illinois, and graduated from Williams College in 1871, and then began the study of law.  After the great fire in Chicago he became a reporter on the Times, later joined the staff of the Interior, and in 1873 became connected with the Chicago Tribune, of which he was successively assistant night editor, Washington correspondent, editorial writer, managing editor, and editor in chief.  He was also president of the Chicago Tribune Company.

Patterson lived in the Patterson Mansion, a Neoclassical 30-room home on Dupont Circle in Washington, D.C., where he entertained many prominent people of the day.

Family tree

References

External links
 

American newspaper editors
American newspaper executives
Medill-Patterson family
Lake Forest Academy alumni
1850 births
1910 deaths
Williams College alumni
People from Dupont Circle
19th-century American businesspeople